Thayer David (born David Thayer Hersey; March 4, 1927 – July 17, 1978) was an American film, stage, and television actor. He was best known for his work on the ABC serial Dark Shadows (1966–1971), and as the fight promoter Miles Jergens in the film Rocky (1976). He also appeared  as Count Saknussemm in the film Journey to the Center of the Earth (1959) and as Dragon in The Eiger Sanction (1975). His raspy distinctive voice narrated many voice-overs in commercials and instructional films.

Early life
Thayer David was born March 4, 1927, in Medford, Massachusetts. His father, Thayer Frye Hersey, was an executive in the paper pulp industry. David attended Harvard University in the 1940s but did not graduate, concentrating instead upon a career on the stage. With financial support from his father, he co-founded the Brattle Theater Company (1948–1952) in Cambridge, Massachusetts, and established himself in the professional theatre.

Stage career

He went on to act in The Relapse 1950 (Sir Tunbelly Clumsey); The Taming of the Shrew 1951 (Grumio);  The Way of the World 1954 (Petulant);  The Carefree Tree  1955 (The Sixth Son); King Lear 1956 (Duke of Cornwall); Mister Johnson 1956 (Gollup); Saint Joan 1956 (The Inquisitor); Protective Custody 1956 (Dr. Steidl); Oscar Wilde 1957 (Oscar Wilde); The Golden Six 1958 (Tiberius); A Man for All Seasons 1961 (Cardinal Wolsey); La Belle 1962; Andorra 1963 (pub keeper); The Seagull 1964 (Sorin); The Crucible 1964 (Danforth); Baker Street 1965 (Moriarty); The Royal Hunt of the Sun 1965 (Miguel Estete); Ring Round the Moon 1966 (Messerchann); Those That Play the Clowns 1966 (Henning); Breakfast at Tiffany's 1966 (Rusty Trawler); The Sorrows of Frederick 1967; The Bench 1968 (Phillipi); Uncle Vanya 1971 (Serebryakov); The Jockey Club Stakes 1973 (Sir Dymock Blackburn); and The Dogs of Pavlov 1974.

Film and television

David played the dark and menacing role of Count Saknussem in the film Journey to the Center of the Earth (1959).  From 1966 to 1971, David portrayed various characters on ABC's daytime phenomenon Dark Shadows.  His many roles on Dark Shadows included Matthew Morgan, Ben Stokes, Professor T. Elliot Stokes, Sandor Rakosi, Count Petofi, Timothy Stokes (Parallel Time), Mordecai Grimes, and Ben Stokes (Parallel Time).  David played different roles in each of the spinoff movies - House of Dark Shadows (1970, playing Professor T. Elliot Stokes); and Night of Dark Shadows (1971, playing Reverend Strack).

On the big screen, he played Reverend Silas Pendrake in Little Big Man (1970). He also played the professional arsonist Charlie Robbins in Save the Tiger (1973) with Jack Lemmon, the afflicted spymaster Dragon in The Eiger Sanction (1975) with Clint Eastwood, and fight promoter Miles Jergens in Rocky (1976).

He played numerous characters on different TV series, including The Wild Wild West, The Rockford Files, Columbo, Ellery Queen, Kojak, Petrocelli, Charlie's Angels, and Hawaii Five-O.

David appeared in TV movies such as Nikita Khrushchev in Francis Gary Powers: The True Story of the U-2 Spy Incident (1976) and The Amazing Howard Hughes (1977), as well as miniseries such as Roots, The Rhinemann Exchange, and Washington: Behind Closed Doors.

In 1977, David played the title role in Nero Wolfe, Paramount Television's made-for-TV movie based on the Rex Stout novel The Doorbell Rang. David portrayed the corpulent detective Nero Wolfe, who took on clients grudgingly and solved mysteries dazzlingly. Intended to be the pilot for a series, the film was shelved by ABC. It eventually aired December 18, 1979, 17 months after David's death. He also played an important role as the lead antagonist, Mr. Edward Byron, in the made-for-TV film Spider-Man (1977), which served as the pilot for the 1978 TV series The Amazing Spider-Man.

Personal life
A resident of Manhattan, Thayer David collected walking sticks, 18th century European landscape paintings, and Victorian furniture. "He was the most widely educated and best-read actor I've ever encountered," said Frank D. Gilroy, who wrote and directed the 1977 TV movie Nero Wolfe.

He was married to and divorced from film and television actress Valerie French.

Thayer David died July 17, 1978, of a heart attack in New York City at the age of 51. He and French had been planning to remarry. He was cremated.

Filmography

Further reading
Hamrick, Craig & Jamison, R. J. Barnabas & Company: The Cast of the TV Classic Dark Shadows Revised (2012) iUniverse, 2012. pp 93–107.

References

External links

1927 births
1978 deaths
American male film actors
American male stage actors
American male television actors
20th-century American male actors
People from Medford, Massachusetts
Harvard University alumni
Nero Wolfe
Male actors from Massachusetts